Stonebyres Falls is a waterfall of the River Clyde in Scotland.  It is located on the former Stonebyres estate at the site of Stonebyres Castle.

See also
Waterfalls of Scotland

References

Waterfalls of South Lanarkshire